Dale Spender (born 22 September 1943) is an Australian feminist scholar, teacher, writer and consultant. In 1983, Dale Spender was co-founder of and editorial advisor to Pandora Press, the first of the feminist imprints devoted solely to non-fiction, committed, according to the New York Times, to showing that "women were the mothers of the novel and that any other version of its origin is but a myth of male creation". She was the series editor of Penguin's Australian Women's Library from 1987. Spender's work is "a major contribution to the recovery of women writers and theorists and to the documentation of the continuity of feminist activism and thought".  In the 1996 Australia Day honours, Spender was awarded Member of the Order of Australia "for service to the community as a writer and researcher in the field of equality of opportunity and equal status for women".

Early life
Spender was born in Newcastle, New South Wales, a niece of the politician Percy Spender and crime writer Jean Spender. The eldest of three children, she has a younger sister Lynne, and a much younger brother Graeme. She attended the Burwood Girls High School in Sydney and she was a Miss Kodak girl. In the early 1960s, as an MA graduate, she taught English at Meadowbank Boys High School, in Sydney's north-western suburbs. In the latter half of the 1960s she taught English literature at Dapto High School. She started lecturing at James Cook University in 1974, before going to live in London and publishing the book Man Made Language in 1980.

Work
The book Man Made Language (1980) is based on Spender's PhD research. Her argument is that in patriarchal societies men control language and it works in their favour. "Language helps form the limits of our reality. It is our means of ordering, classifying and manipulating the world" (1980:3). Where men perceive themselves as the dominant gender, disobedient women who fail to conform to their given inferior role are labelled as abnormal, promiscuous, neurotic or frigid. Spender draws parallels with how derogatory terms are used to maintain racism (1980:6). Man Made Language illustrates how linguistic determinism interconnects with economic determinism to oppress women in society and provides a wide breadth of analysis to do this. The book explores the assumed deficiencies of women, silencing, intimidation and the politics of naming.

In 1991, Spender published a literary spoof, The Diary of Elizabeth Pepys (1991 Grafton Books, London). Purportedly written by Elisabeth Pepys, the wife of Samuel Pepys, the book is a feminist critique of women's lives in 17th century London.

Spender is a co-originator of the database WIKED (Women's International Knowledge Encyclopedia and Data) and founding editor of the Athene Series and Pandora Press, commissioning editor of the Penguin Australian Women's Library, and associate editor of the Great Women Series (United Kingdom).

Today Spender is particularly concerned with intellectual property and the effects of new technologies: in her terms, the prospects for "new wealth" and "new learning". For nine years she was a director of Copyright Agency Limited (CAL) in Australia and for two years (2002–2004) she was the chair. She is also involved with the Second Chance Programme, which tackles homelessness among women in Australia.

Personal life
She has been in a relationship with Professor Ted Brown for over three decades. They have no children. She consistently dresses in purple clothes, a choice she initially made for its symbolic reference to the suffragettes. She resides in Brisbane, Australia.

Publications
 The Spitting Image, Reflections on language, education and social class (Rigby, 1976). Co-author with Garth Boomer
Man Made Language (Routledge & Kegan Paul, 1980)
Learning to Lose: Sexism and Education, (Women's Press, 1980). Co-editor with Elizabeth Sarah 
Men's Studies Modified: The Impact of Feminism on the Academic Disciplines (Pergamon Press, 1981)
 Invisible Women: The Schooling Scandal (Writers & Readers Ltd, 1982, Women's Press, 1989)
 Women of Ideas and What Men Have Done to Them: From Aphra Behn to Adrienne Rich (ARK Paperbacks, 1982)
 Feminist Theorists: Three Centuries of Women's Intellectual Traditions (Women's Press, 1983). Editor. 
 There's Always Been a Women's Movement This Century (Pandora Press, 1983)
 Time and Tide Wait for No Man (Pandora Press, 1984)
 For the Record: The Making and Meaning of Feminist Knowledge (Women's Press, 1985)
 Mothers of the Novel: 100 Good Women Writers Before Jane Austen (Pandora Press, 1986). Includes a list of 106 little-known early women novelists.
Series editor for Pandora Press Mothers of the Novel series (1986–89) which has republished novels by Mary Brunton, Frances Burney, Maria Edgeworth, Eliza Fenwick, Sarah Fielding, Mary Hamilton, Mary Hays, Eliza Haywood, Elizabeth Inchbald, Harriet Lee and Sophia Lee, Charlotte Lennox, Sydney Owenson, Amelia Opie, Frances Sheridan, and Charlotte Turner Smith. 
Scribbling Sisters (Camden Press, 1986) Co-author with Lynne Spender.
The Education Papers. Women's Quest for Equality in Britain, 1850-1912 (Routledge 1987). Editor.
Writing a New World: Two Centuries of Australian Women Writers (Penguin Books, 1988)
The Penguin Anthology of Australian Women's Writing (Penguin Books, 1988) Editor.
 The Writing or the Sex?, Or, Why You Don't Have to Read Women's Writing to Know It's No Good (Pergamon Press, Athene Series, 1989)
 Co-edited with Janet Todd, Anthology of British Women Writers: From the Middle Ages to the Present Day (Pandora, 1990)
Heroines, Anthology of Australian Women Writers; with articles by Ruby Langford Ginibi, Eva Johnson and Diane Bell. (Penguin, 1991). Editor. 
The Diary of Elizabeth Pepys, A spoof of Samuel Pepys' excesses from his wife's imagined diary (Grafton, 1991) 
Living by the Pen: Early British Women Writers (Teachers College Press, 1992). Editor. 
The Knowledge Explosion: Generations of Feminist Scholarship. (Teachers College Press, 1992). Co-editor with Cheris Kramarae.  
Weddings and Wives (Penguin 1994). Editor.  
 Nattering on the Net: Women, Power and Cyberspace (Spinifex, 1995)
The Education Papers. Women's Quest for Equality in Britain, 1850-1912 (Routledge 1987). Editor.
Routledge International Encyclopedia of Women: Global Women's Issues and Knowledge. 4 volumes. General editors: Cheris Kramarae & Dale Spender, 800 contributors. (Routledge 2000). Translated into Spanish and Mandarin.

Speeches 

 "Reclaiming Feminism: EnGendering Change: Is there an app for where we're at?" Opening address at the Association of Women Educators biennial conference 2014, published on line by Social Change Agency, as "A brilliant introduction to feminism in Australia and a call for coding the new revolution"
"Building up or dumbing down?" A Keynote Address to the Communities Networking/Networking Communities Conference, 17 February 1998, considers whether the new information medium, particularly the Internet, is a good or bad thing for humanity.

References

External links
 Website of Dale Spender
 ABC Queensland profile of Dale Spender
 ABC interview with Dale Spender on Talking Heads
 

1943 births
Living people
Australian women writers
Australian historians
Academic staff of James Cook University
People from Newcastle, New South Wales
Australian feminist writers
Women historians